The 2007–08 season was the fourth season of competitive association football in the Football League played by Milton Keynes Dons Football Club, a professional football club based in Milton Keynes, Buckinghamshire, England. Their fourth-place finish in 2006–07 and loss to Shrewsbury Town in the play-offs meant it was their second successive season in League Two. After the closure of the National Hockey Stadium this was the first season where the MK Dons played home fixtures at Stadium mk. The season ran from 1 July 2007 to 30 June 2008.

Paul Ince, starting his first season as Milton Keynes Dons manager, made nine permanent summer signings. After the eighth round of League Two fixtures the MK Dons reached first place and occupied this spot in thirty-seven of the remaining thirty-eight game weeks; they ended the season as champions of the twenty-four-team 2007–08 Football League Two. MK Dons also won their first national knockout competition, with a 2–0 victory over Grimsby Town at Wembley Stadium in the 2008 Football League Trophy Final. They lost in their opening round match in the 2007–08 FA Cup, and were eliminated in the second round of the Football League Cup.

Thirty-one players made at least one appearance in nationally organised first-team competition, and there were sixteen different goalscorers. Defender Dean Lewington missed only two of the fifty-five first-team matches over the season. Mark Wright finished as leading scorer with fifteen goals, of which thirteen came in league competition and two came in the Football League Trophy. Keith Andrews won the Football League Two Player of the Year Award.

Background and pre-season

The 2006–07 season was Martin Allen first season as manager of Milton Keynes Dons, after Danny Wilson was sacked at the end of the 2005–06 season for failing to save the club from relegation to League Two. Having been second come the start of 2007, the team finished in fourth-place in the 2006–07 Football League Two – one point below an automatic promotion place; this meant that the team participated in the League Two play-offs. MK Dons were beaten 2–1 on aggregate by Shrewsbury Town in the play-off semi-final. In May 2007 Allen moved on to manage Championship side Leicester City after both clubs had negotiated a compensation package.

Ahead of 2007–08, MK Dons released Adolfo Baines, Lee Harper, Junior Lewis, Nick Rizzo, Jamie Smith and Oliver Thorne. Players sold were Paul Butler to Chester City, Dominic Blizzard to Stockport County, Gary Smith to Brentford, Izale McLeod to Charlton Athletic and Clive Platt to Colchester United. Milton Keynes Dons made nine summer signings, those being goalkeepers Nathan Abbey from Brentford and Willy Guéret from Swansea City; defender Jude Stirling from Peterborough United; midfielders Colin Cameron from Coventry City, Luke Howell from Gillingham, Alan Navarro from Macclesfield Town and Mark Wright from Walsall; and forwards Drewe Broughton from Chester City and Kevin Gallen from Queens Park Rangers.

Summary and aftermath

On 29 September 2007 Milton Keynes Dons reached first place and stayed there for the rest of the season except for one game week. The lowest position the club occupied was 19th after the first round of fixtures. For the first time in their history, the MK Dons had a better record away than at home in the league. The team won 18 matches, drew three and lost two away, compared to winning 11, drawing seven and losing five at home. Dean Lewington recorded the highest number of appearances during the season, appearing in 53 of the MK Dons' 55 matches. Mark Wright was the Dons' top scorer in the league and in all competitions, with 11 league goals and 15 in total. Three other players, Keith Andrews, Lloyd Dyer and Aaron Wilbraham, reached double figures.

As a result of their promotion the Milton Keynes Dons returned to Football League One after two seasons in League Two. Prior to the club's return to League One, the MK Dons released Drewe Broughton, Matt Carbon, Sam Collins, Liam Kelly, Jake Livermore and Kieran Murphy, while Mustapha Carayol, Lloyd Dyer and Gareth Edds left on their own accord for Torquay United, Leicester City and Tranmere Rovers. New players to join were midfielders Flavien Belson from FC Metz, Peter Leven from Chesterfield and Florian Sturm from FC Vaduz.

Competitions

League Two

Final table

Source: Sky Sports

Matches

FA Cup

Matches

League Cup

Matches

League Trophy

Matches

Player details
List of squad players, including number of appearances by competition.
Players with squad numbers struck through and marked  left the club during the playing season.

|}

Transfers

Transfers in

Transfers out

Loans in

Loans out

References

External links

Official Supporters Association website
MK Dons news on MKWeb

Milton Keynes Dons F.C. seasons
Milton Keynes Dons